Anchorman: Music from the Motion Picture is the soundtrack album to the 2004 film Anchorman: The Legend of Ron Burgundy. The album is a compilation of the songs used in the film. Will Ferrell, in character as Ron Burgundy, gives a brief introduction to each song, and can be heard crying throughout "Shannon".

Track listing

Other songs in the film
Songs in the film but not in this soundtrack include:
 "Deep Burgundy" - Marc Ellis
 "El Paso" - Marty Robbins
 "If" - Bread
 "Baby Making Flute Solo" - Marc Ellis and Katisse Buckingham; includes a portion of the melody of "Aqualung" by Jethro Tull
 "Bread and Butter" - The Newbeats
 Mexican hat dance

Notes

References

2004 soundtrack albums
Comedy film soundtracks
Republic Records soundtracks